The relations between the Catholic Church and the state have been constantly evolving with various forms of government, some of them controversial in retrospect. In its history, the Church has had to deal with various concepts and systems of governance, from the Roman Empire to the medieval divine right of kings, from nineteenth- and twentieth-century concepts of democracy and pluralism to the appearance of left- and right-wing dictatorial regimes. The Second Vatican Council's decree Dignitatis humanae stated that religious freedom is a civil right that should be recognized in constitutional law.

Catholicism and the Roman Emperors
Christianity emerged in the 1st century as one of many new religions in the Roman Empire. Early Christians were persecuted as early as 64 A.D. when Nero ordered large numbers of Christians executed in retaliation for the Great Fire of Rome. Christianity remained a growing minority religion in the empire for several centuries. Roman persecutions of Christians climaxed due to Emperor Diocletian till the turn of the 4th century. Following Constantine the Great's victory on Milvian Bridge, which he attributed to a Christian omen he saw in the sky, the Edict of Milan declared that the empire would no longer sanction persecution of Christians. Following Constantine's deathbed conversion in 337, all emperors adopted Christianity, except for Julian the Apostate who, during his brief reign, attempted unsuccessfully to re-instate paganism.

In the Christian era (more properly the era of the first seven Ecumenical Councils, 325–787) the Church came to accept that it was the emperor's duty to use secular power to enforce religious unity. Anyone within the Church who did not subscribe to Catholicism was seen as a threat to the dominance and purity of "the one true faith" and emperors saw it as their right to defend this faith by all means at their disposal.

Beginning with Edward Gibbon in The History of the Decline and Fall of the Roman Empire some historians have taken the view that Christianity weakened the Roman Empire through its failure to preserve the pluralistic structure of the state. Pagans and Jews lost interest and the Church drew the most able men into its organisation to the detriment of the state.

The papacy and the Divine Right of Kings
The doctrine of the divine right of kings came to dominate mediaeval concepts of kingship, claiming biblical authority (Epistle to the Romans, chapter 13). Augustine of Hippo in his work The City of God had stated his opinion that while the City of Man and the City of God may stand at cross-purposes, both of them have been instituted by God and served His ultimate will. Even though the City of Man – the world of secular government – may seem ungodly and be governed by sinners, it has been placed on earth for the protection of the City of God. Therefore, monarchs have been placed on their thrones for God's purpose, and to question their authority is to question God. It is worth mentioning that Augustine also said "a law that is not just, seems to be no law at all" and Thomas Aquinas indicated laws "opposed to the Divine good" must not be observed.
This belief in the god-given authority of monarchs was central to the Roman Catholic vision of governance in the Middle Ages, Renaissance and Ancien Régime. But this was most true of what would later be termed the ultramontaine party and the Catholic Church has recognized republics, on an exceptional basis, as early as 1291 in the case of San Marino.

During early medieval times, a near-monopoly of the Church in matters of education and of literary skills accounts for the presence of churchmen as their advisors. This tradition continued even as education became more widespread. Prominent examples of senior members of the church hierarchy who advised monarchs were Cardinal Thomas Wolsey in England, and Cardinals Richelieu and Mazarin in France; prominent, devoutly Catholic laymen like Sir Thomas More also served as senior advisors to monarchs.

Besides advising monarchs, the Church held direct power in mediaeval society as a landowner, a power-broker, a policy maker, etc. Some of its bishops and archbishops were feudal lords in their own right, equivalent in rank and precedence to counts and dukes. Some were even sovereigns in their own right, while the Pope himself ruled the Papal States. Three archbishops played a prominent role in Holy Roman Empire as electors. As late as the early 18th century in the era of the Enlightenment, Jacques-Benigne Bossuet, preacher to Louis XIV, defended the doctrine of the divine right of kings and absolute monarchy in his sermons. The Church was a model of hierarchy in a world of hierarchies, and saw the defense of that system as its own defense, and as a defense of what it believed to be a god-ordained system.

During the French Wars of Religion, the monarchomachs began to contest the divine right of kings, setting up the bases for the theory of popular sovereignty and theorizing the right of tyrannicides.

The French Revolution
The central principle of the medieval, Renaissance, and ancien régime periods, monarchical rule "by God's will", was fundamentally challenged by the 1789 French Revolution. The revolution began as a conjunction of a need to fix French national finances and a rising middle class who resented the privileges of the clergy (in their role as the First Estate) and nobility (in their role as the Second Estate). The pent-up frustrations caused by lack of political reform over a period of generations led the revolution to spiral in ways unimaginable only a few years earlier, and indeed unplanned and unanticipated by the initial wave of reformers. Almost from the start, the revolution was a direct threat to clerical and noble privilege: the legislation that abolished the feudal privileges of the Church and nobility dates from August 4, 1789, a mere three weeks after the fall of the Bastille (although it would be several years before this legislation came fully into effect).

At the same time, the revolution also challenged the theological basis of royal authority. The doctrine of popular sovereignty directly challenged the former divine right of kings. The king was to govern on behalf of the people, and not under the orders of God. This philosophical difference over the basis of royal and state power was paralleled by the rise of a short-lived democracy, but also by a change first from absolute monarchy to constitutional monarchy and finally to republicanism.

Under the doctrine of the divine right of kings, only the Church or God could interfere with the right of a monarch to rule. Thus the attack on the French absolute monarchy was seen as an attack on God's anointed king. In addition, the Church's leadership came largely from the classes most threatened by the growing revolution. The upper clergy came from the same families as the upper nobility, and the Church was, in its own right, the largest landowner in France.

The revolution was widely seen, both by its proponents and its opponents, as the fruition of the (profoundly secular) ideas of the Enlightenment. The 1789 Declaration of the Rights of Man and of the Citizen, voted by the National Constituent Assembly, seemed to some in the church to mark the appearance of the antichrist, in that they excluded Christian morality from the new "natural order". The fast-moving nature of the revolution far outpaced Roman Catholicism's ability to adapt or come to any terms with the revolutionaries.

In speaking of "the Church and the Revolution" it is important to keep in mind that neither the Church nor the Revolution were monolithic. There were class interests and differences of opinion inside the Church as well as out, with many of the lower clergy – and a few bishops, such as Talleyrand – among the key supporters of the early phases of the revolution. The Civil Constitution of the Clergy, which turned Church lands into state property and the clergy into employees of the state, created a bitter division within the church between those "jurors" who took the required oath of allegiance to the state (the abbé Grégoire or Pierre Daunou) and the "non-jurors" who refused to do so. A majority of parish priests, but only four bishops, took the oath.

As a large-scale landowner tied closely to the doomed ancien regime, led by people from the aristocracy, and philosophically opposed to many of the fundamental principles of the revolution, the Church, like the absolute monarchy and the feudal nobility, was a target of the revolution even in the early phases, when leading revolutionaries such as Lafayette were still well-disposed toward King Louis XVI as an individual. Instead of being able to influence the new political elite and so shape the public agenda, the Church found itself sidelined at best, detested at worst. As the revolution became more radical, the new state and its leaders set up its own rival deities and religion, a Cult of Reason and, later, a deistic cult of the Supreme Being, closing many Catholic churches, transforming cathedrals into "temples of reason", disbanding monasteries and often destroying their buildings (as at Cluny), and seizing their lands. In this process many hundreds of Catholic priests were killed, further polarising revolutionaries and the Church.  The revolutionary leadership also devised a revolutionary calendar to displace the Christian months and the seven-day week with its sabbath. Catholic reaction, in anti-revolutionary risings such as the revolt in the Vendée, were often bloodily suppressed.

France after the Revolution
When Napoleon Bonaparte came to power in 1799, he began the process of coming back to terms with the Catholic Church. The Church was reestablished in power during the Bourbon Restoration, with the ultra-royalists voting laws such as the Anti-Sacrilege Act. The Church was then strongly counter-revolutionary, opposing all changes made by the 1789 Revolution. The July Revolution of 1830 marked the end of any hope of a return to the ancien regime status of an absolute monarchy, by establishing a constitutional monarchy. The most reactionary aristocrats, in favor of an integral restoration of the Ancien Régime and known as Legitimists, began to retire from political life.

However, Napoleon III's regime did support the Pope, helping to restore Pope Pius IX as ruler of the Papal States in 1849 after there had been a revolt there in 1848. Despite this official move, the process of secularization continued throughout the 20th century, culminating with the Jules Ferry laws in the 1880s and then with the 1905 law on separation of Church and state, which definitively established state secularism (known as laïcité).

The Church itself remained associated with the Comte de Chambord, the Legitimist pretender to the throne. It was only under Pope Leo XIII (r: 1878–1903) that the Church leadership tried to move away from its anti-Republican associations, when he ordered the deeply unhappy French Church to accept the Third French Republic (1875–1940) (Inter innumeras sollicitudines encyclical of 1892). However, his liberalising initiative was undone by Pope Pius X (r: 1903–1914), a traditionalist who had more sympathy for the French monarchists than for the Third Republic.

Catholicism in the United Kingdom and Ireland
Following William of Orange's victories over King James II, by 1691 the supremacy of Protestantism was entrenched throughout the kingdoms of England, Scotland and Ireland. The economic and political power of Catholics, especially in Ireland, was severely curtailed. This was reinforced by the introduction of the Penal Laws. The practice of Catholicism (including the celebration of the Mass) was made illegal as Catholic priests celebrated the sacraments at risk of execution by law.

However, towards the end of the eighteenth century a rapprochement began to develop between London and the Vatican. Britain's activities abroad and relations with Catholic countries were hampered by the tension that existed between it and the Church, and it was eager to persuade the Church to end its moral support for Irish separatism. Likewise, the Church was keen to send missionaries to the newly conquered colonies of the British Empire, especially Africa and India, and to ease the restrictions on its British and Irish adherents. Britain began to phase out the penal laws, and in 1795 it financed the building of St. Patrick's College, Maynooth, a seminary for the training of Catholic priests, in County Kildare. In return, the Church agreed to actively oppose Irish separatism, which it duly did in the Irish Rebellion of 1798. It continued this policy until the early 1900s, condemning each successive attempt by Irish republicanism to achieve independence from Britain through violence.

Pius IX and Italian unification
Over the course of the 19th century, Italian nationalism put increasing strain on the Pope's rule of the Papal States. Italian unification culminated in Garibaldi's capture of Rome in 1870, which ended the Catholic Church's temporal sovereignty and led Pope Pius IX to declare himself a prisoner in the Vatican. The conflict between the Italian state and the Papacy continued with the state's regulation of the Church and the Pope's voting and parliamentary boycott, and was finally resolved in 1929 by the Lateran Treaty between Mussolini and Pope Pius XI, confirming the Vatican City-State and accepting the loss of the Papal States..

Leo XIII
Pope Leo XIII, responding to the rise of popular democracy, tried a new and somewhat more sophisticated approach to political questions than his predecessor Pius IX.

On May 15, 1891, Leo issued the encyclical Rerum novarum (Latin: "About New Things").  This addressed the transformation of politics and society during the Industrial Revolution of the nineteenth century. The document criticised capitalism, complaining of the exploitation of the masses in industry. However, it also sharply reproved the socialist concept of class struggle, and the proposed solution of eliminating private property. Leo called for strong governments to protect their citizens from exploitation, and urged Roman Catholics to apply principles of social justice in their own lives.

This document was rightly seen as a profound change in the political thinking of the Holy See.  It drew on the economic thought of St Thomas Aquinas, who taught that the "just price" in a marketplace should not be allowed to fluctuate due to temporary shortages or gluts.

Seeking a principle to replace the threatening Marxist doctrine of class struggle, Rerum Novarum urged social solidarity between the upper and lower classes, and endorsed nationalism as a way of preserving traditional morality, customs, and folkways. In effect, Rerum Novarum proposed a kind of corporatism, the organisation of political power along industrial lines, similar to the mediaeval guild system. Under corporatism, the individual's place in society is determined by the ethnic, work, and social groups which one was born into or joined. Leo rejected one-person, one-vote democracy in favour of representation by interest groups. A strong government should serve as arbiter among the competing factions.

Forty years later, the corporatist tendencies of Rerum Novarum were underscored by Pope Pius XI's May 25, 1931, encyclical Quadragesimo anno ("In the Fortieth Year"), which restated the hostility of Rerum Novarum to both unbridled competition and class struggle. The precepts of Leo and Pius were espoused by the Catholic social movement of Distributism, which later influenced the Fascist and Christian Democratic movements.

The Church and the twentieth century
Early in the 20th century, the Catholic Church supported anti-democratic regimes, such as in Spain's National Catholicism. By the end of the century, countries that had once been heavily influenced by the Catholic Church became more secular and democratic (e.g,, Spain, Italy, Ireland).

Croatia 

Ivan Grubišić, a Catholic priest and a member of the Croatian Parliament fought for termination or revision of the Treaties between the Republic of Croatia and the Holy See, which were deemed to unbalance the relations between the Church and the Croatian state.

Spain

In Spain, the Falange enjoyed the support of many in the Roman Catholic Church.  Spain had a long history of contention between Catholic, largely monarchist, traditionalists and advocates of secular liberal democracy, or of more radical anticlerical views. Traditionalist Catholics, already alienated by the liberal secularism of the Second Spanish Republic whose democratically elected government imposed limitations and intrusions upon the Church, were moved to outright hostility by what they viewed as the government's failure to prevent or punish attacks on churches and the killing of priests and other religious by various Republican armed groups.  Almost 7,000 clergy were killed, despite even though very few clergy actively engaged in the opposition to the Republic.

These attacks were frequent in the first months of the civil war, and radicalised a large number of Catholics, including clergy, who had previously tended to support the reformist right wing Spanish Confederation of the Autonomous Right party. A number of Catholics decided that the liberal state could not (or would not) protect them or their Church and switched to supporting the rebel Nationalists, led by General Francisco Franco.

The Church's association with monarchists was particularly clear in the case of Carlism, which sought to place monarchs from a rival lineage on the throne. Basque nationalism, on the contrary, saw the majority of Basque priests break ranks with the Church to support the Republican government. This led to Franco branding them as traitors and communists.

After taking power in 1936, Franco received political privileges from the Church similar to those accorded Spanish monarchs, such as the right to propose three candidates for each episcopal vacancy, from which the Pope would select a bishop. In processions, Franco was also covered by a pallium, a cloak conferred by the pope and usually indicating top ecclesiastical status.

During the 1960s and the 1970s, the movement of worker priests expressed the view of young priests unhappy with the hierarchy and the government. They organized parishes as social betterment centers. The contacts with Marxism led many to join leftist groups or to secularize. An agreement of Church and State turned one seminary into a special jail for prisoners who were priests.

France
The pro-Catholic movement Action Française (AF) campaigned for the return of the monarchy and for aggressive action against Jews, as well as a corporatist system. It was supported by a strong section of the clerical hierarchy, eleven out of seventeen cardinals and bishops. On the other hand, many Catholics regarded the AF with distrust, and in 1926, Pope Pius XI explicitly condemned the organization. Several writings of Charles Maurras', the leading ideologist of AF and an agnostic, were placed on the Index Librorum Prohibitorum at the same time. However, in 1939 Pope Pius XII waived the condemnation. Maurras' personal secretary, Jean Ousset, later went on to found the Cité catholique fundamentalist organization along with former members of the OAS terrorist group created in defense of "French Algeria" during the Algerian War.

Ireland
The Roman Catholic Church was granted "special recognition" in the Constitution of Ireland when it was drawn up in 1937, although other religions were also mentioned. This remained the case until 1972, when the constitution was amended by plebiscite. In 1950 the Church helped force the resignation of the Minister for Health Noel Browne over his proposals to provide free healthcare to mothers and children, which the Church believed would result in promotion of birth control. The Government of Northern Ireland gave the Church considerably more responsibility for education than they enjoyed in the Republic and this remains the case today.

The considerable influence of the Church over Irish politics since independence in 1922 declined sharply in the 1990s after a series of child-abuse scandals. In recent decades, the Church has lost ground to the secular movement in social issues such as divorce and abortion.

Elsewhere in Europe
The association of Roman Catholicism, sometimes in the form of the hierarchical church, sometimes in the form of lay Catholic organisations acting independently of the hierarchy, produced links to dictatorial governments in various states.

 In Austria, Engelbert Dollfuss turned a Roman Catholic political party into the single party of a one-party state. In rural Austria the Catholic Christian Social Party collaborated with the Heimwehr militia and helped bring Dollfuss to power in 1932. In June 1934, he produced his authoritarian constitution which stated "We shall establish a state on the basis of a Christian Weltanschauung". The Pope described Dollfuss as a "Christian, giant-hearted man ... who rules Austria so well, so resolutely and in such a Christian manner. His actions are witness to Catholic visions and convictions. The Austrian people, Our beloved Austria, now has the government it deserves".
 In Poland, in 1920s Józef Piłsudski founded a military-style government (Sanacja) that incorporated Catholic corporatism into its ideology. After the Second World War the Catholic Church was a focal point of opposition to the Communist regime. Many Catholic priests were arrested or disappeared for opposing the communist regime of People's Republic of Poland. Pope John Paul II encouraged opposition to the Communist regime in such a way that it would not draw retaliation, becoming (in a quote from CNN) "a resilient enemy of Communism and champion of human rights, a powerful preacher and sophisticated intellectual able to defeat Marxists in their own line of dialogue." After the fall of the Soviet Union, Poland became a multiparty democracy and several parties which professed to defend Catholicism were legalised, like Akcja Wyborcza Solidarność or Liga Polskich Rodzin.

Fascism

For strategic reasons, it was desirable for the fascist movements of Benito Mussolini in Italy and Hitler in Germany not to alienate Catholics en masse.

Modern researchers are divided on the degree of the Church's connection to fascism.  Usually historians of the period reject claims of active complicity or active resistance, painting a picture of a Catholic leadership who chose neutrality or mild resistance over an explicit ideological struggle with fascism.

The closest ties of Roman Catholicism to fascism may have come in the clerical fascism in wartime Croatia; see Involvement of Croatian Catholic clergy with the Ustasa regime.

Italy
In 1924, Pope Pius XI forbade the Catholic Popular Party to work with the Socialist Party against Mussolini's Fascist Party (whose politics at that time were a complex amalgam of left and right). The pope later dissolved the Catholic Popular Party.

Fear of communism, and a certain disdain for the liberal democracy that had revoked the long-standing privileges enjoyed by the Catholic Church, were made explicit in such papal documents as Quanta cura and the Syllabus of Errors. These documents have been interpreted by some as showing Church support for Fascism, or at least with leanings toward fascism. By the Lateran Treaties, Mussolini granted Pope Pius XI the crown of Vatican City as a nation to rule, made Roman Catholicism the state church of Italy, and paid the Pope compensation for the loss of the Papal States. This indicates a de facto recognition by the Pope of Mussolini's coup.  The relationship to Mussolini's government deteriorated drastically in later years.

Germany

The division of Germans between Catholicism and Protestantism has figured into German politics since the Protestant Reformation. The Kulturkampf that followed German unification was the defining dispute between the German state and Catholicism.

In Weimar Germany, the Centre Party was the Catholic political party. It disbanded around the time of the signing of the Reichskonkordat (1933), the treaty that continues to regulate church-state relations to this day. Pius XI's encyclical Mit brennender Sorge (1937) protested what it perceived to be violations of the Reichskonkordat. The role of Catholic bishops in Nazi Germany remains a controversial aspect of the study of Pope Pius XII and the Holocaust.

Slovakia
During World War II, Jozef Tiso, a Roman Catholic monsigneur, became the Nazi quisling in Slovakia. Tiso was head of state and the security forces, as well as the leader of the paramilitary Hlinka Guard, which wore the Catholic Episcopal cross on its armbands. The Catholic clergy was represented at all levels of the regime and its corporatist ideology was based on papal encyclicals.

Croatia
Mile Budak, the Minister of Religion of Independent State of Croatia, said on 22 July 1941:

The Ustashi movement is based on the Catholic Religion. For the minorities, Serbs, Jews and Gypsies, we have three million bullets. A part of these minorities has already been eliminated and many are waiting to be killed. Some will be sent to Serbia and the rest will be forced to change their religion to Catholicism. Our new Croatia will therefore be free of all heretics, becoming purely Catholic for the future years.
Notice the absence of a mention of Bosnian Muslims.
Unlike Serbs, they were considered Croatian brothers whose ancestors converted to Islam.

Controversy surrounds the depths of the involvement of the Roman Catholic clergy with the Ustaše, a Croatian Fascist movement in the former Yugoslavia. According to Branko Bokun, a Roman Catholic priest made the following remarks on 13 June 1941:

The issue of clerical fascism in wartime Croatia is further discussed in the article Involvement of Croatian Catholic clergy with the Ustaša regime.

Belgium

The Belgian Fascist movement Rexism arose out of a conservative Catholic movement and its publications. The full names of the Rexists was Christus Rex or "Christ the King".

United States
Prior to 1961, the U.S. had never had a Catholic president. Many Protestants were afraid that if a Catholic were elected president, he would take orders directly from the Pope. This was one reason why Al Smith, the Democratic governor of New York, lost the 1928 presidential election to Herbert Hoover. The surprise bestseller of 1949–1950 was American Freedom and Catholic Power by Paul Blanshard. Blanshard accused the Catholic Church hierarchy of having an undue influence on legislation, education and medical practice. Years later, John F. Kennedy, spoke to a convention of Baptist pastors in Louisiana during his election campaign. He assured them that, if elected, he would put his country before his religion.

Since the late 1960s, the Catholic Church has been politically active in the U.S. around the "life issues" of abortion, assisted suicide and euthanasia, with some bishops and priests refusing communion to Catholic politicians who publicly advocate for legal abortion. This has created a stigma within the Church itself however. The church has also played significant roles in the fights over capital punishment, gay marriage, welfare, state secularism, various "peace and justice" issues, among many others.  Its role varies from area to area depending upon the size of the Catholic Church in a particular region and on the region's predominant ideology. For example, a Catholic church in the Southern U.S. would be more likely to be against universal health care than a Catholic church in New England.

Robert Drinan, a Catholic priest, served five terms in Congress as a Democrat from Massachusetts before the Holy See forced him to choose between giving up his seat in Congress or being laicized.  The 1983 Code of Canon Law forbids Catholic priests from holding political office anywhere in the world.

Argentina 

Secularism was enforced in Argentina in 1884 when President Julio Argentino Roca passed Law 1420 on secular education. In 1955, the Catholics nationalists overthrew General Perón in the "Revolución Libertadora", and a concordat was signed in 1966. Catholic nationalists continued to play an important role in the politics of Argentina, while the Church itself was accused of having set up ratlines to organize the escape of former Nazis after WWII. Furthermore, several important Catholic figures have been accused of having supported the "Dirty War" in the 1970s, including Pope Francis, then-Archbishop of Buenos Aires. Antonio Caggiano, Archbishop of Buenos Aires from 1959 to 1975, was close to the fundamentalist Cité catholique organisation, and introduced Jean Ousset (former personal secretary of Charles Maurras, the leader of the Action française)'s theories on counter-revolutionary warfare and "subversion" in Argentina.

Brazil

Australia
Traditionally, Catholics in Australia had been predominantly of Irish descent. They have also been traditionally in the working-class. As a result, for much of its early history, the Australian Labor Party had a significant proportion of Catholics as members and supporters. However, this historical link has eroded over time and Catholics are now present across the political spectrum. Prominent Archbishop Daniel Mannix was perhaps the most politically vocal Catholic figure, including his opposition to conscription. This conscription debate was often framed in terms of a divide between Protestants and Catholics.

Links between the Catholic Church and Australian politics strengthened when the Australian Labor Party split and the Democratic Labour Party was founded, chiefly under the influence of Bob Santamaria. In one state, the Catholic Church threw its institutional support behind this party and the movements upon which it relied. However, after the Archbishop died, the party and the Industrial groups upon which it was based no longer had any Church support.

International law 
In 2003, Pope John Paul II became a prominent critic of the 2003 US-led invasion of Iraq. He sent his "Peace Minister", Cardinal Pio Laghi, to talk with US President George W. Bush to express opposition to the war. John Paul II said that it was up to the United Nations to solve the international conflict through diplomacy and that a unilateral aggression is a crime against peace and a violation of international law.

Communism

Pope John Paul II offered support to the Polish Solidarity movement. Soviet leader Mikhail Gorbachev once said the collapse of the Iron Curtain would have been impossible without John Paul II. But Catholic attitudes toward communism have evolved and Pope Francis has taken the focus off ideologies and placed it on the sufferings of people under both systems, with the hope-filled conclusion.

See also 

Caesaropapism
Category:Catholic political parties
Estates of the realm
Gallicanism
Guelph
History of the Roman Catholic Church
Missi dominici
Separation of church and state
Theocracy
Weiblingen
Integralism § Catholic integralism

References

secular movement
History of the Catholic Church
Catholicism and politics